The 9th Force Support Battalion (9 FSB) is an Australian Army logistics battalion. Formed on 1 August 1998, following the amalgamation of a number of air despatch, military police, ships army detachments, personnel and transport units, it is based at RAAF Base Amberley in Amberley. 9 FSB is part the 17th Sustainment Brigade. Its role is to provide third line or 'general' support within an area of operations.

On 30 May 2011, Lance Corporal Andrew Jones, a cook from 9 FSB, was killed in action in Afghanistan while serving with the Force Support Unit in Uruzgan Province.

The battalion consists of the following units:

Special Advisory Group 
9th Logistic Support Company 
26th Transport Squadron 
37th Force Supply Company 
176th Air Dispatch Squadron (RAAF Base Richmond)
8th Personnel Services Company

Notes

References

Combat service support battalions of the Australian Army
Military units and formations established in 1998

Military units in Queensland